This list of bridges of Nepal draws up an inventory of the remarkable bridges of Nepal, as well by their dimensional characteristics, as by their architectural or historical interest.

The long suspension bridges of Nepal 
Modern roads are few and mostly concentrated on the Terai plain, the area stretching along the border with India and which accounts for nearly half of the country's population. In 2020, there is only one railway line of 59 kilometers, also located near India and the capital Kathmandu has no railway connection. The population is essentially rural in this region at the foot of the Himalayas, but the steep reliefs are a brake on the development of the local populations who are already among the poorest in the world.

Until the 1950s, the whole country with the exception of the Terai was provided only with trails for a large part of the territory, some essential trade routes had been established since the beginning of the 20th century, despite the isolation of the Nepal. Louis Harper introduced the first modern suspension footbridges to Nepal in the late 1890s, he had improved the system in the United Kingdom from wooden pylons to steel lattice pylons, they were pre-fabricated in Scotland and shipped to site for assembly. At least 4 bridges of this type remain in service in Nepal today. This system was unfortunately not effective and failed to meet significant demand.

Under an increasingly strong demand, a second generation of bridges had developed with economic and environmental stakes, these bridges are optimized to be built with local materials and carried out by a local workforce in order to extend this system across the country. They will nevertheless have shorter spans than the first generation bridges, in the order of 40 to 120 meters.

In September 2015, a total of 6000 completed trail bridges has been celebrated.

But the needs are still numerous and signs of weakness are beginning to appear, it is estimated that 200 the number of bridges require heavy work, even replacement (statistics mid-2004). Some footbridges are built on great heights in order to fight against flooding during the monsoon, 14 bridges were destroyed during the glacial break-up of Digcho in the Sagarmatha area in 1985. This phenomenon, also called jökulhlaup, is caused by the rupture of a glacier and causes sudden and devastating floods. The devastated bridges were later rebuilt on higher levels.

They are rediscovered today by tourists during organized backpackings on the footpaths of Everest, Annapurna, the Kathmandu Valley and other sites along Nepal.

Historical and architectural interest bridges 
Among the notables bridges of Nepal, we can mention the Dodhara Chandani Bridge which has the originality of being composed of 4 successive suspension bridges with three spans, and a total of 8 large steel truss pylons, which spans nearly 1,500 meters. Its four main spans have very large arrows and each is held by lateral support cables. The bridge is designed as a pedestrian bridge, but bicycles and motorcycles can use the bridge as well. There is enough room so that motorcycles can pass even if they are fully loaded. All traffic travels on the left-hand side, as everywhere else in Nepal.

The bridges presented here are initially sorted by date of commissioning, they thus retrace part of the history of transport in Nepal and the various developments that led to the structures that can be seen today.

Major road bridges 
Nepal's largest road bridge, the Karnali Bridge, was designed by Steinman, Boynton, Gronquist & Birdsall of USA, constructed by Kawasaki Heavy Industries of Japan and funded by the World Bank. It is part of the country's largest highway, the Mahendra Highway H01, which crosses the Terai region from east to west and over Nepal's longest and widest river, the Ghaghara (also called Karnali) which ends in the Ganges. The Karnali Bridge is the only road bridge with a span of more than 300 meters in Nepal, the H01 highway like the other highways in the country, avoids major obstacles as much as possible, such as the many rivers resulting from melting snow of the Himalayas and overly mountainous areas which would require much more expensive infrastructure. The very underdeveloped railway network is an additional reason for the scarcity of major bridges other than footbridges in Nepal.

Major footbridges 

See also 

 Transport in Nepal
 Rail transport in Nepal
 List of roads in Nepal
 Geography of Nepal
 List of rivers of Nepal
 Annapurna Circuit

Notes and references 
 Notes

 

 Others references

Further reading

External links 

 
 
 
 
 
 

Nepal
 
Bridges
Bridges